Artsvashen or Bashkend is a de jure Armenian village in the Chambarak Municipality of the Gegharkunik Province of Armenia. It is a 40 square kilometres exclave of Armenia, and it is surrounded by the territory of Azerbaijan, which has de facto controlled it since the First Nagorno-Karabakh War.

History 
The present village was founded in 1854 or 1859 as Bashkend by Armenians from Choratan in Shamshadin, although an earlier Armenian presence on the site is attested by an inscription dated to 1607 on the Surb Hovhannes church in the town. It was later changed to Hin Bashkend, meaning Old Bashkend to differentiate it from New or Nor Bashkend, founded by migrants from the original settlement. The villagers' ancestors were originally from the province of Artsakh who migrated to Tavush. In 1920 the village was also referred to as Bashgyugh.

In 1923–1929, the territorial dispute over Artsvashen was settled by a commission of the "Transcaucasian central executive committee" in favour of Armenia, however, in January 1927,  of land surrounding Artsvashen were "gifted" to Azerbaijan. As "compensation", in February 1929 Armenia was transferred a narrow strip of land to serve as a land connection to the village, however, this decision was reversed in the 1930s and Artsvashen became an enclave again.

In May 1991, during the First Nagorno-Karabakh War, the Armenian Interior Ministry reported that residents of Artsvashen had averted an army occupation by surrendering their arms. Seen from the Azerbaijani perspective, however, the town became a major headache, blocking access to Shinikh and providing a launching point for military incursions against Azerbaijan's Gadabey province.

After Armenian attacks on Mutudərə and Qasımağalı in the Shinikh area to the west, the Azerbaijanis counter attacked under locally famed commander Cahangir Rüstəmov, whose regiment blockaded Artsvashen. On August 8, 1992 the Armenian defenders decided to surrender. Artsvashen villagers were mostly given alternative shelter in the town of Chambarak whose former Molokan-Russian population had largely left for Russia. According to The New York Times, on 9 August 1992 Azerbaijani side announced that armed forces had "liberated" the town, destroying enemy tanks and weaponry and killing 300 Armenian "brigands", while Armenian reports mentioned no dead but said 29 people were "missing without trace."

Accusing Azerbaijan of mounting an "undeclared war," Armenian President Levon Ter-Petrosyan sent a telegram to leaders of the Commonwealth of Independent States saying that "aggression has been committed against a state that is a member of the C.I.S. and the system of collective security".

The village was swiftly renamed to its settler name Bashkend. Today, the village is largely abandoned as the Azerbaijani army expelled its Armenian population after it captured the territory, and is now administered by Azerbaijan as part of the Gadabay District.

Compensation claims
In 2009, former residents of Artsvashen village that were still residents of Chambarak nearly 20 years later were promised six billion drams of Armenian government compensation for their lost property. Two payments of 50 million drams then, in 2011, a bigger one of 708 million drams was given out in 2011, with around 2000 people getting about 360 thousand drams each. However, further payments stalled leading to protests in September 2018 and December 2019, demanding further funds to repair the dilapidated housing stock in Chambarak. Armenian premier Pashinyan claimed that the state had fulfilled all its obligations to refugees with money already disbursed and with the provision of housing certificates to  about 112 families.

Artsvashen carpets 
In the Soviet times there was a branch of Haygorg ("Armenian carpet" state company) in Artsvashen. After the capture of Artsvashen by the Azerbaijani forces, the residents of Artsvashen migrated to Shorzha, Vardenis, Abovyan and Chambarak, where they continued traditions of this art:
"The women of Artsvashen learned carpet weaving from their mothers and grandmothers. Many of them had worked for Haygorg for decades. “It was shameful for a girl or woman in Artsvashen not to be able to weave carpets. Even if they didn't work for Haygorg, they would have a weaving stand at home and make carpets,” 
said Irina Ghalechyan, a former resident of Artsvashen and carpet weaver.

Demographics 
The population timeline of Artsvashen since 1831 is as follows:

Gallery

Notable people 
 Aramais Sahakyan, Armenian poet
 Saribek Chilingaryan, Hero of the Soviet Union

See also 
 Barkhudarli
 Yukhari Askipara
 Karki (Azerbaijan)
 List of enclaves and exclaves

Notes

References

External links 
 
 
 

Populated places in Gegharkunik Province
Enclaves and exclaves
Populated places established in 1845